Lucas Javier Mulazzi (born 27 September 1999) is an Argentine professional footballer who plays as a centre-back for Deportivo Laferrere.

Career
Mulazzi got his career in senior football underway with Temperley. Having been an unused substitute for eleven fixtures across three seasons from 2016–17, four of which were as a seventeen-year-old in April 2017, Mulazzi made his debut in 2018–19 on 20 April 2019 during a Primera B Nacional match at the Estadio Alfredo Beranger versus Platense; featuring for the full duration of a 1–1 draw. On 17 January 2020, Mulazzi was loaned out Spanish club Elche CF Ilicitano with a purchase option of around € 350,000 for 70% of the player's rights. However, he returned to Temperley after six games played for the Spanish side.

Career statistics
.

References

External links

1999 births
Living people
People from Quilmes
Argentine footballers
Argentine expatriate footballers
Association football defenders
Sportspeople from Buenos Aires Province
Primera Nacional players
Tercera División players
Club Atlético Temperley footballers
Elche CF Ilicitano footballers
Deportivo Laferrere footballers
Argentine expatriate sportspeople in Spain
Expatriate footballers in Spain